Polygala comosa is a species of flowering plant in the family Polygalaceae. It is endemic to most of Europe.

References

comosa
Flora of Albania
Flora of Austria
Flora of Latvia
Flora of Lithuania 
Flora of Belarus
Flora of Belgium
Flora of Bulgaria
Flora of  Slovakia 
Flora of Finland
Flora of France
Flora of Germany
Flora of Greece
Flora of Hungary
Flora of Italy
Flora of Kyrgyzstan
Flora of Mongolia 
Flora of Poland
Flora of Romania
Flora of Russia
Flora of Spain
Flora of Sweden
Flora of Switzerland
Flora of Turkey
Flora of Ukraine
Flora of Uzbekistan
Flora of Yugoslavia